Hesperinus is a genus of flies and the sole genus in the relict family Hesperinidae belonging to the nematoceran infraorder Bibionomorpha. There are about 8 known species, nearly all from the Palaearctic region with one each from the Nearctic and Neotropical regions. Three fossil species from Eocene Baltic amber have been described. These flies have long 12-segmented antennae, legs and abdomen and males have well-developed wings while females have a short one. Little is known, but most species have been collected near streams in woodlands.

Species 
Hesperinus brevifrons Walker, 1848
Hesperinus conjugens Schiner, 1868
Hesperinus cuspidistylus Hardy & Takahashi, 1960
Hesperinus electrus Skartveit, 2009
Hesperinus graecus Papp, 2010
Hesperinus heeri (Heyden & Heyden, 1865)
Hesperinus hyalopterus Skartveit, 2009
Hesperinus imbecillus (Loew, 1858)
Hesperinus macroulatus Skartveit, 2009
Hesperinus nigratus Okada, 1934 
Hesperinus ninae Papp & Krivosheina, 2010
Hesperinus rohdendorfi Krivosheina & Mamaev, 1967

References 

Monotypic Diptera genera
Palearctic insects
Bibionomorpha
Bibionomorpha genera
Nematocera families